Pripps was a major brewery in Sweden and is now a part of Carlsberg, in which Pripps remains as a trademark. The company was based in Stockholm; their main product was Pripps Blå. They also owned Ramlösa. Pripps was founded in Gothenburg by Johan Albrecht Pripp in 1828.

Beer
Pripps Blå, lit. Pripp's Blue, is a light lager first introduced in 1959; it is said to be one of the most popular beers in Sweden.

Pripps Blå is an inexpensive beer, for it is brewed with exactly 51% barley — the minimum amount of barley in beer required by Swedish law. A low-calorie version called Pripps Blå Light is also made. Other versions are Pripps Blå Extra Stark, a full malt, extra strong beer with 7.2% alcohol and Pripps Blå Pure with a lower carbohydrates content, scheduled to replace Pripps Blå Light.

Brewery
The beers are brewed at Carlsberg Sverige.

CEOs of Pripps bryggerier AB
1972-1981 - Kurt Rydé
1981-???? - Nils Holgerson
1985-1986 - Bill Fransson
1986-1990 - Hans Källenius

References

External links 
 Official Pripps website (in Swedish)
 Official Pripps Blå website (in Swedish)
 RateBeer

Breweries in Sweden
History of Gothenburg
Manufacturing companies based in Gothenburg